Cherokee Strip is a census-designated place in Kern County, California. The population was 206 at the 2010 census.

Demographics

At the 2010 census Cherokee Strip had a population of 227. The racial makeup of Cherokee Strip was 84 (37.0%) White, 0 (0.0%) African American, 4 (1.8%) Native American, 0 (0.0%) Asian, 0 (0.0%) Pacific Islander, 117 (51.5%) from other races, and 22 (9.7%) from two or more races. Hispanic or Latino of any race were 187 people (82.4%).

The whole population lived in households, no one lived in non-institutionalized group quarters and no one was institutionalized.

There were 56 households, 32 (57.1%) had children under the age of 18 living in them, 34 (60.7%) were opposite-sex married couples living together, 7 (12.5%) had a female householder with no husband present, 6 (10.7%) had a male householder with no wife present.  There were 7 (12.5%) unmarried opposite-sex partnerships, and 1 (1.8%) same-sex married couples or partnerships. 7 households (12.5%) were one person and 4 (7.1%) had someone living alone who was 65 or older. The average household size was 4.05.  There were 47 families (83.9% of households); the average family size was 4.45.

The age distribution was 80 people (35.2%) under the age of 18, 27 people (11.9%) aged 18 to 24, 64 people (28.2%) aged 25 to 44, 38 people (16.7%) aged 45 to 64, and 18 people (7.9%) who were 65 or older.  The median age was 27.3 years. For every 100 females, there were 100.9 males.  For every 100 females age 18 and over, there were 96.0 males.

There were 64 housing units at an average density of 706.2 per square mile, of the occupied units 33 (58.9%) were owner-occupied and 23 (41.1%) were rented. The homeowner vacancy rate was 5.7%; the rental vacancy rate was 4.2%.  131 people (57.7% of the population) lived in owner-occupied housing units and 96 people (42.3%) lived in rental housing units.

References

Census-designated places in Kern County, California
Census-designated places in California